Still Alice is a 2014 American drama film written and directed by Richard Glatzer and Wash Westmoreland and based on the 2007 novel by Lisa Genova. It stars Julianne Moore as Alice Howland, a linguistics professor diagnosed with familial Alzheimer's disease shortly after her 50th birthday. Alec Baldwin plays her husband, John, and Kristen Stewart, Kate Bosworth, and Hunter Parrish play her children.

Glatzer and Westmoreland were approached by Lex Lutzus and James Brown to adapt Genova's novel in 2011, when Glatzer had just been diagnosed with amyotrophic lateral sclerosis (ALS). Moore was their first choice for the lead role. She researched Alzheimer's disease for months to prepare for the role. The film was shot in New York in March 2014, with a budget of $4 million.

Still Alice had its world premiere at the 2014 Toronto International Film Festival on September 8, 2014. It was one of several films stolen in the Sony Pictures hack incident and leaked online on November 27, 2014. The film was released theatrically on January 16, 2015, and grossed $43.9 million at the international box office. It received critical acclaim, with praise for Moore's performance which won numerous awards including the Academy Award for Best Actress. She dedicated her Academy Award win to Glatzer, who died from ALS in March 2015. The film was included among the year's top ten independent films by the National Board of Review.

Plot
Alice Howland, a linguistics professor at Columbia University, celebrates her 50th birthday with her physician husband John and their three adult children. After she forgets a word during a lecture and becomes lost during a jog on campus, Alice's doctor diagnoses her with early onset familial Alzheimer's disease. Alice's elder daughter, Anna, and son, Tom, take a genetic test to find out if they will develop the disease. Alice's younger daughter Lydia, an aspiring actress, decides not to be tested.

As Alice's memory begins to fade, she daydreams of her mother and sister, who died in a car crash when she was a teenager. She memorizes words and sets a series of personal questions on her phone, which she answers every morning. She hides sleeping pills in her room, and records a video message instructing her future self to commit suicide by overdosing on the pills when she can no longer answer the personal questions. As her disease advances, she becomes unable to give focused lectures and loses her job. She also becomes lost searching for the bathroom in her own vacation home and does not recognize Lydia after seeing her perform in a play.

John is offered a job at the Mayo Clinic in Minnesota. Alice asks him to postpone accepting the job, but he feels this is impossible. At her doctor's suggestion, Alice delivers a speech at an Alzheimer's conference about her experience with the disease, using a highlighter to remind herself which parts of the speech she has already spoken, and receives a standing ovation.

Alice begins to have difficulty answering the questions on her phone. At one point, she loses the phone and becomes distressed; John finds it a month later in the freezer, but Alice thinks it has only been missing for a day.

After a video call with Lydia, Alice inadvertently opens the video with the suicide instructions. With some difficulty, she finds the pills and is about to swallow them, but when she is interrupted by the arrival of her caregiver, she drops the pills on the floor and forgets what she was doing.

John, unable to watch his wife continue to deteriorate, moves to Minnesota. Lydia, who has been living in California, moves back home to care for Alice. Lydia reads her a section of the play Angels in America and asks her what she thinks it is about. Alice, now barely able to speak, responds with a single word: "love".

Cast

Production
Still Alice is based on a novel of the same name published in 2007. The novel was written by Lisa Genova, a neuroscientist who was inspired by her grandmother's development of Alzheimer's disease to write about the disease from a firsthand perspective. British film producers Lex Lutzus and James Brown bought the rights to a film adaptation of the novel and pitched the project to their friends, filmmaking partners and married couple Richard Glatzer and Wash Westmoreland, in 2011. Glatzer and Westmoreland were initially hesitant to write and direct the film because Glatzer had just been diagnosed with amyotrophic lateral sclerosis (ALS); they thought that writing about Alzheimer's disease, another neurodegenerative disease, "may be a little too close to the bone". They ultimately took up the offer and wrote a screenplay based on Genova's novel in early 2012. Elements of the story were lifted from Glatzer's experience with ALS and Westmoreland's role as his primary caregiver.

Julianne Moore was Glatzer and Westmoreland's first choice for the lead role. Moore prepared for the role over four months, watching documentaries about Alzheimer's disease. She met with Elizabeth Gelfand Stearns, the co-producer of the film and the head of The Judy Fund, which partners with the Alzheimer's Association in the fight to cure Alzheimer's Disease. Introductions were made to Dr. Mary Sano, the director of Alzheimer's disease research at Mount Sinai Hospital. Through Skype, she talked to three women with early-onset Alzheimer's disease; she also visited a support group for women with Alzheimer's disease and a long-term care facility for Alzheimer's patients. She also undertook the cognitive testing used for diagnosing dementia with a neuropsychiatrist. Moore suggested Alec Baldwin to play Alice's husband, since they had previously worked together on the sitcom 30 Rock. Kate Bosworth was cast after she told Glatzer and Westmoreland "how important and personal the subject matter was" to her; she had family members with Alzheimer's disease and, after reading Genova's book, set out to become involved in the film adaptation.

Principal photography took place in New York over 23 days in March 2014. Most of the film was shot in a townhouse on West 162nd Street in Manhattan. Some scenes were filmed in an apartment building in Yonkers and a senior's home in Hastings-on-Hudson. The film was shot by French cinematographer Denis Lenoir, whom Glatzer and Westmoreland had met at a film screening in 1999; they had wanted to work with him ever since. During filming, Glatzer and Westmoreland attempted to divide the directing duties equally between themselves, even though Glatzer's physical condition had deteriorated to the point that he could only communicate by typing on an iPad with a single finger.

The production's $4-5 million budget was funded by the French financier BSM Studio. Post-production on the film was completed ten days before its premiere at the 2014 Toronto International Film Festival. The score was composed by Ilan Eshkeri, who wanted to work on Still Alice because of his experience with people affected by Alzheimer's disease in his personal life. He had worked on several Alzheimer's-related projects before, including the 2012 film Ashes, Tim Wheeler's 2014 album Lost Domain, and an advertising campaign for the Alzheimer's Society; he said of working on Still Alice, "in many ways this was a culmination of an artistic expression of something that has deeply touched me." Eshkeri wrote the score to be performed on piano, which he intended to represent Alice's family life, and by a string trio, of which he thought the challenge of composition was similar to "the challenge of coping with the disease".

Release
Still Alice had its world premiere at the Toronto International Film Festival on September 8, 2014. Sony Pictures Classics, which bought the U.S. distribution rights for the film, gave it a one-week release in December 2014 so that it would qualify for that year's Academy Awards. After making the deal with Sony, Westmoreland and Glatzer were eager to have the film released as early as possible, partly because of Glatzer's declining health. The film began its proper theatrical run with a limited release on January 16, 2015, earning $197,000 from 12 locations on its opening weekend. On February 20, it was given a wide release, expanding to 765 theaters across the U.S. Overall, the film grossed $18,754,371 over 14 weeks in American theaters. It earned $25,130,281 in other countries for a worldwide gross of $43,884,652.

Piracy
The film was part of the confidential data stolen in the Sony Pictures hack incident; it was leaked onto peer-to-peer file sharing websites on November 27, 2014, over a month ahead of its scheduled release. Along with it came Fury and three other unreleased Sony Pictures films (Annie, Mr. Turner, and To Write Love on Her Arms). Within three days of the leak, Still Alice had been downloaded by an estimated 103,832 unique IP addresses.

Reception

Critical response

On the review aggregator website Rotten Tomatoes, Still Alice has a "Certified Fresh" rating of 85% based on 206 reviews, with an average rating of 7.40/10. The site's consensus reads, "Elevated by a gripping performance from Julianne Moore, Still Alice is a heartfelt drama that honors its delicate themes with bravery and sensitivity." On Metacritic, which assigns a weighted mean rating out of 100 reviews from film critics, the film has a score of 72 out of 100, based on 41 critics, indicating "generally favorable reviews".

Rolling Stone critic Peter Travers wrote of "the blazing artistry" of Moore's performance, which he said was "alive with ferocity and feeling and committed to truth". Mick LaSalle of the San Francisco Chronicle described Moore's portrayal of Alice as "convincing, disturbing and personal", while Entertainment Weeklys Chris Nashawaty cited it as being "among her most devastating performances". In a review for The Globe and Mail, Liam Lacey wrote of her "transparent emotional presence", though he felt that "the part [of Alice] barely scratches the surface of her ability". The Daily Telegraph critic Tim Robey felt that Moore's "astonishingly delicate and sad" performance was one of her career highlights, and characterized the film as a whole as "gorgeous [and] piercing".

Empire magazine's David Hughes gave Still Alice five out of five stars, highlighting Moore's "note-perfect performance" and Glatzer and Westmoreland's "sensitivity and scalpel-sharp precision". Deborah Young, reviewing the film for The Hollywood Reporter, praised the directors' "restrained, understated approach" to the story, which she saw as "the best insurance against sloppy sentimentality". The Los Angeles Times critic Kenneth Turan attributed the film's success to Moore and Stewart's ability "to keep things honest" despite parts of it seeming "contrived and overly familiar". Peter Debruge of Variety complimented Glatzer and Westmoreland's "dignified" and "personal" approach to the subject matter, as well as their decision to tell the story from Alice's point of view.

Other critics gave the film lukewarm reviews. A. O. Scott of The New York Times praised Moore's and Stewart's performances, but felt that the story was "too removed from life to carry the full measure of pain that Alice deserves". The New Yorker critic Anthony Lane criticized Glatzer and Westmoreland for "flinch[ing]" when it came to showing Alice's deterioration and its effect on her family, and found the film's sentimental aspects "manipulative—and effective". The Austin Chronicles Josh Kupecki gave the film 2.5 out of 5 stars, finding it clichéd and melodramatic, and likening it to a public service announcement. Richard Roeper, writing for the Chicago Sun-Times, described Moore as giving "a four-star performance in a two-star movie", drawing attention to the "intrusive" score and the "maddeningly overwrought and heavy-handed" storytelling.

Accolades
For her performance as Alice Howland, Julianne Moore won the Academy Award, BAFTA Award, Golden Globe Award, Screen Actors Guild Award, and Critics' Choice Movie Award. Still Alice marked her first Academy Award win after four previous nominations. Although she was widely considered to be the Best Actress frontrunner in anticipation of the Academy Awards ceremony, some critics felt that Still Alice was not among Moore's greatest performances and did not deserve to win. Moore dedicated her Academy Award win to Glatzer, who died from ALS several weeks later on March 10, 2015.

References

External links

 
 
 
 
 

2014 films
2014 drama films
2014 independent films
American drama films
Films directed by Wash West
Films scored by Ilan Eshkeri
American independent films
American films about Alzheimer's disease
Films about Alzheimer's disease
Films about educators
Films based on American novels
Killer Films films
Sony Pictures Classics films
Films set in New York City
Films shot in New York (state)
BAFTA winners (films)
Films featuring a Best Actress Academy Award-winning performance
Films featuring a Best Drama Actress Golden Globe-winning performance
Films about mother–daughter relationships
2010s English-language films
2010s American films